Jake Herbert (born March 6, 1985) is an American amateur wrestler. Herbert won the 2012 U.S. Olympic Trials at 84 kg FS and competed in the 2012 Olympics.

High school
Born in Pittsburgh, Herbert was a Pennsylvania state champion and four-time state placer at North Allegheny High School in Wexford, Pennsylvania.

College
Herbert was a two-time NCAA champion, three-time Big Ten Conference champion, and four-time NCAA All-American. He went 149-4 while at Northwestern University. He won the 2009 Dan Hodge Trophy awarded to the best college wrestler in the nation and the 2009 Big Ten Athlete of the Year award.

International
Herbert won a silver medal at the 2009 World Wrestling Championships at 84kg FS competed at the 2010 World Wrestling Championships at 84kg FS.

Herbert defeated Travis Paulson 2 to 1 at the finals of the 2012 U.S. Olympic Trials.

Herbert currently works with Andy Hrovat, who represented the United States at 84 kg FS in the 2008 Olympics.

Herbert came very close to obtaining a medal in the 2012 Olympics, but missed the opportunity due to a controversial referee's call.

Personal life
He is the cousin of singer Josh Herbert.

References

External links
 

Wrestlers at the 2012 Summer Olympics
Olympic wrestlers of the United States
1985 births
Living people
Northwestern Wildcats wrestlers
World Wrestling Championships medalists
American male sport wrestlers
Pan American Games silver medalists for the United States
Pan American Games medalists in wrestling
Wrestlers at the 2015 Pan American Games
Big Ten Athlete of the Year winners
Medalists at the 2015 Pan American Games
Northwestern University alumni